Rovereta is a village (curazia) in San Marino. It belongs to the municipality (castello) of Serravalle. Its name, in Italian language, refers to a wood of "Sessile Oaks".

History

In 1957 there was a constitutional crisis named Fatti di Rovereta (the Rovereta affair), in which the Grand and General Council was deliberately rendered inquorate to prevent the scheduled election of Captains-Regent. A provisional government was established in the village of Rovereta, in opposition to the outgoing Captains-Regent whose term had expired.

Geography
The village is situated in the north-western corner of its castle, close to Falciano and to the borders with Italy, at the industrial area of Cerasolo (a civil parish of Coriano). It is served by the National Road 72 Rimini-San Marino, the San Marino Highway.

See also
Serravalle
Cà Ragni
Cinque Vie
Dogana
Falciano
Lesignano
Ponte Mellini
Valgiurata

Curazie in San Marino
Italy–San Marino border crossings
Serravalle (San Marino)